Nelson  is an English given name, more commonly used as a surname.

It is derived from a patronymic name created from the given name "Nell," or for the Irish, "Niall".

People with the given name Nelson

A
Nelson Abadía (born 1956), Colombian football manager
Nelson Abbott (born 1966), American attorney
Nelson Abeijón (born 1973), Uruguayan footballer
Nelson Acevedo (born 1988), Argentine footballer
Nelson Acosta (born 1944), Uruguayan footballer
Nelson Adams (born 1953), American physician
Nelson Adams (boxer) (born 1967), Puerto Rican boxer
Nelson Aerts (born 1963), Brazilian tennis player
Nelson Agbesi (1939–2016), Ghanaian barrister
Nelson Agho (born 2003), English footballer
Nelson Agholor (born 1993), American football player
Nelson Agresta (born 1955), Uruguayan footballer
Nelson Akwari (born 1982), American soccer player
Nelson W. Aldrich (1841–1915), American politician
Nelson W. Aldrich Jr. (1935–2022), American educator
Nelson Algren (1909–1981), American writer
Nelson Allen (1933–2005), American politician
Nélson Almeida (born 1979), Angolan tennis player
Nelson Alom (born 1990), Indonesian footballer
Nelson Amadin (born 2001), Dutch footballer
Nelson Mauricio Ancheta (born 1963), Salvadoran footballer and manager
Nelson Annandale (1876–1924), Scottish zoologist
Nelson Araujo (born 1987), American politician
Nelson Rodríguez Arévalo, Colombian gang leader
Nelson Asaytono (born 1967), Filipino basketball player
Nelson Ascencio (born 1964), Cuban-American actor
Nelson Asofa-Solomona (born 1996), New Zealand rugby league footballer
Nelson Atiagli (born 1996), Ghanaian footballer
Nelson Avila (born 1940), Argentine dancer
Nelson Azeem, Pakistani politician
Nelson Azevedo-Janelas (born 1998), Belgian footballer

B
Nelson Baker (1842–1936), American priest
Nelson C. Baker, American civil engineer
Nelson Ball (rugby union) (1908–1986), New Zealand rugby union footballer
Nelson Balongo (born 1999), Belgian-Congolese footballer
Nelson Barahona (born 1987), Panamanian footballer
Nelson Barbosa (born 1969), Brazilian economist
Nelson H. Barbour (1824–1905), American writer
Nelson Barbudo (born 1960), Brazilian politician
Nelson Barclift (1917–1993), American choreographer
Nelson Barrera (1957–2002), Mexican baseball player
Nelson Cárcamo Barrera, Chilean politician
Nelson Barrere (1808–1883), American politician
Nelson B. Bartram (1832–1886), American army officer
Nelson Bascome (1955–2009), Bermudian politician
Nelson Estupiñán Bass (1912–2002), Ecuadorian writer
Nelson Batista (born 1962), Cuban dancer
Nelson J. Beach (1800–1876), American surveyor
Nelson Becerra (born 1987), Peruvian footballer
Nelson F. Beckwith (1813–1873), American politician and businessman
Nelson Benítez (born 1984), Argentine footballer
Nelson Bentley (1918–1990), American poet
Nelson Bernal (born 1972), Paraguayan footballer
Nelson Betancourt (1887–1947), Trinidadian cricketer
Nelson Gordon Bigelow (1840–1892), Canadian lawyer and politician
Nelson Boateng (born 1968), Ghanaian sprinter
Nelson Bolan (born 1990), West Indian cricketer
Nelson S. Bond (1908–2006), American writer
Nelson Bonilla (born 1990), Salvadorian footballer
Nelson Borges (disambiguation), multiple people
Nelson Bornier (1950–2021), Brazilian lawyer and politician
Nelson Blanco (born 1999), Salvadorian footballer
Nelson Bragg (born 1961), American musician
Nelson Brickham (1927–2007), American intelligence officer
Nelson Briles (1943–2005), American baseball player
Nelson Brito (born 1960), Ecuadorian football manager
Nelson V. Brittin (1920–1951), American soldier
Nelson Brizuela (born 1950), Paraguayan footballer
Nelson Broms (born 1919), American business executive
Nelson Brown, American curler
Nelson C. Brown (1885–??), American professor
Nelson Burbrink (1921–2001), American baseball player
Nelson M. Burroughs (1899–1998), American prelate
Nelson Burton (disambiguation), multiple people

C
Nelson Cabrera (disambiguation), multiple people
Nelson Calzadilla (born 1954), Venezuelan boxer
Nelson Carmichael (born 1965), American skier
Nelson Carrero (bron 1953), Venezuelan footballer
Nelson Victor Carter (1887–1916), English army officer
Nelson Case (1910–1976), American radio announcer
Nelson Castro (disambiguation), multiple people
Nelson Catalina (born 1950), American basketball coach
Nelson Cavaquinho (1911–1986), Brazilian singer
Nelson Cereceda (born 1991), Chilean footballer
Nelson Chabay (1940–2018), Uruguayan footballer
Nelson Chai (born 1965), American investment banker
Nelson Chamisa (born 1978), Zimbabwean politician
Nelson Chanady (born 1963), American motocross racer
Nelson Chelle (1931–2001), Uruguayan basketball player
Nelson W. Cheney (1875–1944), American politician
Nelson Cherutich (born 1993), Bahraini steeplechase
Nelson Chia, Singaporean theatre director
Nelson Chittum (born 1933), American baseball player
Nelson Chui (born 1947), Peruvian engineer
Nelson Clarke (1914–1982), Canadian politician
Nelson Coates, American production designer
Nelson Cobb (1811–1894), American judge
Nelson D. Cole (1833–1899), American army officer and politician
Nelson Colón, Puerto Rican basketball coach
Nelson Cooke (1919–2018), Australian cellist
Nelson M. Cooke (1903–1965), American entrepreneur
Nelson Cossio (born 1966), Chilean footballer
Nelson Cowan (born 1951), American psychology professor
Nelson Cowles (1930–2021), American politician
Nelson Cragg (born 1978), American film director
Nelson Crispin (born 1992), Colombian Paralympic swimmer
Nelson Cruikshank (1902–1986), American policy analyst
Nelson Cruz (disambiguation), multiple people
Nelson Cuevas (born 1980), Paraguayan footballer
Nelson Cupello (born 1951), Brazilian footballer and manager

D
Nélson da Conceição (1900–??), Brazilian footballer
Nelson da Luz (born 1998), Angolan footballer
Nelson Dantas (1927–2006), Brazilian actor
Nelson Horatio Darton (1865–1948), American geologist
Nelson Davidyan (1950–2016), Armenian wrestler and coach
Nelson Davis (disambiguation), multiple people
Nelson Dawson (1859–1941), British artist
Nelson Dean (1899–1939), American baseball player
Nélson de Araújo (1926–1993), Brazilian writer
Nelson Debenedet (born 1947), Italian-Canadian ice hockey player
Nelson DeCastro (born 1969), American comic book artist
Nelson Delailomaloma, Fijian politician
Nelson de la Rosa (1968–2006), Dominican actor
Nelson Dellis (born 1984), American memory athlete
Nelson del Valle (born 1965), Puerto Rican politician
Nelson Demarco (1925–2009), Uruguayan basketball player
Nelson DeMille (born 1943), American author
Nelson Dewey (1813–1889), American politician
Nelson Diaz (disambiguation), multiple people
Nelson Diebel (born 1970), American swimmer
Nelson Dieppa (born 1971), American boxer
Nelson S. Dilworth (1890–1965), American farmer and politician
Nelson Dingley Jr. (1832–1899), American politician and journalist
Nelson Dladla (born 1954), South African footballer
Nelson Doi (1922–2015), American politician
Nelson Dollar (born 1961), American politician
Nelson Domínguez (born 1957), Cuban water polo player
Nelson dos Santos (born 1952), Brazilian sprinter
Nelson Doubleday (1889–1949), American publisher
Nelson Doubleday Jr. (1933–2015), American businessman
Nelson Dunford (1906–1986), American mathematician

E
Nelson Eddy (1901–1967), American singer
Nelson E. Edwards (1887–1954), American film historian
Nelson Effiong (born 1953), Nigerian politician
Nelson Elder (1923–1983), Northern Irish politician
Nelson Emerson (born 1967), Canadian ice hockey player
Nelson Erazo (athlete) (1959–2017), Puerto Rican track athlete
Nelson Evans (1889–1922), American photographer
Nelson Évora (born 1984), Portuguese triple jumper

F
Nelson Delle-Vigne Fabbri (born 1949), Italian pianist
Nelson Famadas (1948–2010), Puerto Rican businessman
Nelson Faria (born 1963), Brazilian guitarist
Nélson Fernandes (born 1946), Portuguese footballer
Nelson Fernández (born 1957), Cuban gymnast
Nelson Ferreira (disambiguation), multiple people
Nelson Fogarty (1871–1933), Namibian bishop
Nelson M. Ford (born 1947), American politician
Nelson Frank (1906–1974), American journalist
Nelson Franklin (born 1985), American actor
Nelson Freire (born 1944), Brazilian pianist
Nelson Fryer (1818–1896), American farmer and politician
Nelson Fu (1894–1968), Chinese doctor
Nelson Fuentes (born 1978), Salvadoran economist

G
Nelson Gabolwelwe (born 1977), Botswanan footballer
Nelson Gaetz (1907–1988), Canadian politician
Nelson Gaichuhie, Kenyan politician
Nélson Gama (born 1972), Bissau-Guinean-Portuguese footballer
Nelson Garner (born 1976), American football player
Nelson B. Gaskill (1875–1964), American politician
Nelson Gavit (1810–1876), American manufacturing executive
Nelson Geingob (born 1982), Namibian footballer
Nelson George (born 1957), American writer
Nelson F. Gibbs (born 1938), American politician
Nelson Gidding (1919–2004), American screenwriter
Nelson Gill, American politician
Nelson Glueck (1900–1971), American rabbi and archaeologist
Nelson L. Goldberg (1930–2005), American telecommunications pioneer
Nelson Gonçalves (1919–1998), Brazilian singer
Nelson González (born 1988), Argentine footballer
Nelson González (musician) (born 1948), Puerto Rican tres player
Nelson Goodman (1906–1998), American philosopher
Nelson Gooneratne (born 1934), Sri Lankan cricket umpire
Nelson H. H. Graburn (born 1936), British professor
Nelson Greene (disambiguation), multiple people
Nelson G. Gross (1932–1997), American politician
Nelson Guarda (1933–2002), Brazilian rower
Nelson Guerrero (born 1962), Ecuadorian footballer
Nelson Gutiérrez (born 1962), Uruguayan footballer

H
Nelson Hackett (1810–??), American escaped slave
Nelson Hahne (1908–1970), American illustrator
Nelson Hairston (1917–2008), American ecologist
Nelson Harding (1879–1944), American cartoonist
Nelson Hardwick (born 1951), American politician
Nelson Hardy (1905–1993), Australian rugby league footballer
Nelson Harris (born 1964), American politician
Nelson Hart (born 1968), Canadian murderer
Nelson B. Hatch (1879–1956), American football coach
Nelson Hawks (1840–1929), American inventor
Nelson Heg (born 1993), Malaysian badminton player
Nelson Henricks (born 1963), Canadian artist
Nelson M. Holderman (1885–1953), American army officer
Nelson K. Hopkins (1816–1904), American lawyer and politician
Nelson Howarth (1904–1945), English footballer
Nelson Bunker Hunt (1926–2014), American businessman

I
Nelson Ibáñez (born 1981), Argentine footballer
Nelson Inz (born 1969), American politician
Nelson Illingworth (1862–1926), Australian sculptor
Nelson Insfrán (born 1995), Argentine footballer
Nelson Ishiwatari (born 2005), Japanese footballer

J
Nelson Jamili (born 1959), Filipino boxer
Nelson Javier (born 1985), Dominican badminton player
Nelson Johnson (born 1948), American lawyer
Nelson T. Johnson (1887–1954), American ambassador
Nelson Johnston (born 1990), Cuban footballer
Nelson Jones (born 1964), American football player

K
Nelson E. Kauffman (1904–1984), American bishop
Nelson Keene (born 1942), British singer
Nelson A. Kellogg (1881–1945), American athlete and coach
Nelson Keys (1886–1939), British actor
Nelson P. W. Khonje (1923–2019), Malawian politician
Nelson Khumbeni (born 2002), English footballer
Nelson Kiang, Chinese-American professor
Nelson King (1914–1974), American disc jockey
Nelson G. Kraschel (1889–1957), American politician
Nelson Kuhn (born 1937), Canadian rower
Nelson Kwei (born 1961), Singaporean conductor
Nelson Kyeremeh, Ghanaian politician

L
Nelson La Due (1831–1900), American politician
Nelson Lam (born 1968), Hong Kong politician
Nelson Laurence (born 1984), Seychellois footballer
Nelson Ledesma (born 1990), Argentine golfer
Nelson Lee (born 1975), Taiwanese-Canadian actor
Nelson Leigh (1905–1985), American actor
Nelson Leirner (1932–2020), Brazilian artist
Nelson Lemmon (1908–1989), Australian politician
Nelson Lemus (1960–1977), Salvadoran religious figure
Nélson Lenho (born 1984), Portuguese footballer
Nelson Levy (??–2007), French Polynesian travel executive
Nelson Lichtenstein (born 1944), American professor
Nelson Lincoln (1914–2000), American sports shooter
Nelson Liriano (born 1964), Dominican baseball player
Nélson Lisboa (1930–2020), Brazilian basketball player
Nelson Nunes Lobo (born 1952), Cabo Verdean artist
Nelson López (born 1941), Argentine footballer
Nelson Seymour Lougheed (1882–1944), Canadian businessman and politician
Nelson Loyola (born 1968), Cuban fencer
Nelson Lucas (born 1979), Seychellois sprinter
Nelson Ludington (1818–1883), American businessman

M
Nelson Madore (1943–2020), American politician
Nelson Maldonaldo-Torres, Puerto Rican philosopher
Nelson Mandela (1918–2013), South African politician and activist
Nelson H. Manning (1832–??), American politician
Nelson Marcenaro (1952–2021), Uruguayan footballer
Nélson Marcos (born 1983), Portuguese footballer
Nelson Margetts (1879–1932), American polo player
Nelson Mariano (born 1974), Filipino chess player
Nelson Martin (born 1958), Canadian football player
Nelson Martinez (disambiguation), multiple people
Nelson Mason (born 1987), Canadian racing driver
Nelson Mathews (born 1941), American baseball player
Nelson E. Matthews (1852–1917), American politician
Nelson Max, American computer scientist
Nelson Mazivisa (born 1985), Zimbabwean footballer
Nelson McCormick (disambiguation), multiple people
Nelson McDowell (1870–1947), American actor
Nelson McVicar (1871–1960), American judge
Nelson Medina (born 1978), Peruvian artist
Nelson Meers (born 1938), Australian politician
Nelson Willy Mejía Mejía, Honduran military officer
Nelson Mensah (born 1973), Ghanaian footballer
Nelson Merced (born 1947), American activist and politician
Nelson Merentes (born 1954), Venezuelan mathematician
Nelson Merlo (born 1983), Brazilian racing driver
Nelson Meurer (1942–2020), Brazilian politician
Nelson Michael, American researcher
Nelson A. Miles (1839–1925), American soldier
Nélson Monte (born 1995), Portuguese footballer
Nélson Monteiro de Souza (1904–??), Brazilian basketball player
Nelson Mora (born 1976), Venezuelan swimmer
Nélson Morais (born 1974), Portuguese footballer
Nelson Morales (born 1976), Guatemalan footballer
Nelson Morgan, American computer scientist
Nelson Morpurgo (1899–1978), Italian lawyer
Nelson Morris (1838–1907), American entrepreneur
Nelson Motta (born 1944), Brazilian journalist
Nelson Muguku (1932–2010), Kenyan entrepreneur
Nelson Müller (born 1979), German restaurateur
Nelson Munganga (born 1993), Congolese footballer
Nelson Munsey (1948–2009), American football player

N
Nelson Navarro (born 1949), Curaçaoan politician
Nelson Ned (1947–2014), Brazilian singer
Nelson Ne'e (1954–2013), Solomon Islands politician
Nelson Nhamussua (born 2001), Mozambican basketball player
Nelson Nieves (1934–2021), Venezuelan fencer
Nelson Nitchman (1908–1991), American athletic coach
Nelson Nogier (born 1996), Canadian ice hockey player
Nelson Norgren (1891–1974), American athletic coach
Nelson Norman (born 1958), American baseball player
Nelson I. Norton (1820–1887), American politician
Nelson R. Norton (1809–??), American politician

O
Nelson Obus (born 1947), American businessman
Nelson Odhiambo (born 1989), Kenyan cricketer
Nelson Oduber (born 1947), Aruban politician
Nelson Ogunshakin, British-Nigerian engineer
Nelson Olanipekun, Nigerian lawyer
Nélson Oliveira (born 1991), Portuguese footballer
Nelson Olmsted (1914–1992), American actor
Nelson Olveira (born 1974), Uruguayan footballer
Nelson Ombito (born 1963), Kenyan judoka
Nelson Oñate (born 1943), Cuban sports shooter
Nelson Onono-Onweng, Ugandan bishop
Nelson Orji (born 2002), Nigerian footballer
Nelson Orozco (born 2000), Bolivian footballer
Nelson Oyarzún (1943–1978), Chilean football manager
Nelson M. Oyesiku, Nigerian neurosurgeon
Nelson Oyoo (born 1994), Kenyan rugby sevens footballer

P
Nelson Silva Pacheco (born 1944), Colombian footballer
Nelson Panciatici (born 1988), French racing driver
Nelson Papucci (born 1968), American politician
Nelson Parraguez (born 1971), Chilean footballer
Nelson Pass (born 1951), American audio designer
Nelson Pedetti (born 1954), Uruguayan footballer
Nélson Pedroso (born 1985), Portuguese footballer
Nelson Peltz (born 1942), American businessman
Nélson Pereira (born 1975), Portuguese footballer
Nelson Pereira dos Santos (1928–2018), Brazilian film director
Nelson J. Perez (born 1961), American prelate
Nelson Pessoa (born 1935), Brazilian equestrian
Nelson Peterson (1913–1990), American football player
Nelson Philippe (born 1986), French race car driver
Nelson Phillips (1873–1939), American judge
Nelson Pinder (1932–2022), American minister
Nelson Pinedo (1928–2016), Colombian singer
Nelson Pinto (born 1981), Chilean footballer
Nelson Piquet (disambiguation), multiple people
Nelson Pizarro (born 1985), American soccer player
Nelson Pizarro (Chilean footballer) (born 1970), Chilean footballer
Nelson Poket (born 1976), Dominican singer-songwriter
Nelson W. Polsby (1934–2007), American political scientist
Nelson D. Porter (1863–1961), Canadian politician
Nelson Thomas Potter Jr. (1939–2013), American philosopher
Nelson Poynter (1903–1978), American publisher
Nelson A. Primus (1842–1916), American artist
Nelson Proença (1950–2022), Brazilian businessman and politician
Nelson Prudêncio (1944–2012), Brazilian athlete
Nélson Purchio (born 1941), Brazilian footballer

Q
Nelson Quan (born 1984), Chinese-American film editor
Nelson Quiñónes (born 2002), Colombian footballer

R
Nelson Rae (1914–1945), American actor
Nelson Jair Cardona Ramírez (born 1969), Colombian prelate
Nelson Ramodike (??–2012), South African politician
Nelson Ramos (disambiguation), multiple people
Nelson Rand, Canadian journalist
Nelson Rangell (born 1960), American jazz musician
Nelson Rattenbury (1907–1973), Canadian politician
Nelson Rebolledo (born 1985), Chilean footballer
Nelson Repenning, American business scholar
Nelson Ribeiro (1910–1973), Brazilian rower
Nelson Riddle (1921–1985), American bandleader
Nelson Riis (born 1942), Canadian politician and businessman
Nelson Rising (1941–2023), American businessman
Nelson Ritsema (born 1994), Dutch rower
Nelson Rivas (born 1983), Colombian footballer
Nelson Rockefeller (1908–1979), American politician
Nelson Rodrigues (1912–1980), Brazilian playwright
Nelson Rodríguez (boxer) (born 1955), Venezuelan boxer
Nelson S. Román (born 1960), American judge
Nelson Royal (1935–2002), American professional wrestler
Nelson Ruiz (born 1949), Venezuelan boxer
Nelson Somerville Rulison (1842–1897), American bishop
Nelson Russell (1897–1971), Northern Irish soldier
Nelson Ruttenberg (1893–1959), American lawyer and politician

S
Nélson Saavedra (born 1988), Chilean footballer
Nelson Saenz (born 1965), Cuban taekwondo practitioner
Nelson Saiers, American artist and mathematician
Nelson Saldana, American cyclist
Nélson Sampaio (born 1992), Portuguese footballer
Nelson León Sánchez (born 1966), Chilean footballer
Nelson Ponce Sánchez (born 1975), Cuban illustrator
Nelson Sanhueza (born 1952), Chilean footballer
Nelson San Martín (born 1980), Chilean footballer
Nelson Santovenia (born 1961), American baseball player
Nelson Sardelli (born 1934), Italian-Brazilian comedian
Nelson Sardenberg (born 1970), Brazilian karate fighter
Nelson Sardinha (born 1966), Angolan basketball player
Nelson Sargento (1924–2021), Brazilian musician
Nelson Saúte (born 1967), Mozambican writer
Nelson Schwenke (??–2012), Chilean singer
Nelson Searcy (born 1971), American minister
Nélson Semedo (born 1993), Portuguese footballer
Nelson Semperena (born 1984), Uruguayan footballer
Nelson Senkatuka (born 1997), Ugandan footballer
Nelson Rodríguez Serna (born 1965), Colombian cyclist
Nelson Serrano (born 1938), Ecuadorian businessman
Nelson Setimani (born 1990), South African cricketer
Nelson Sewankambo (born 1952), Ugandan physician
Nelson Shanks (1937–2015), American painter
Nelson Sharpe (1858–1935), American judge
Nelson Shin (born 1939), Korean film executive
Nelson Shoemaker (1911–2003), Canadian politician
Nelson Simmons (born 1963), American baseball player
Nelson D. Simons (1885–1953), American native leader
Nelson Sing (born 1995), Timorese footballer
Nelson Skalbania (born 1938), Canadian engineer
Nelson Solórzano (born 1959), Venezuelan basketball player
Nelson Sossa (born 1986), Bolivian footballer
Nelson Soto (born 1963), Chilean footballer and manager
Nelson Soto (cyclist) (born 1994), Colombian cyclist
Nelson Spencer (1876–1943), Canadian merchant
Nelson Spruce (born 1992), American football player
Nelson Stacy (1921–1986), American race car driver
Nelson Stokley (1944–2010), American football player
Nelson Stoll, American sound engineer
Nelson Stone (born 1984), Papua New Guinean runner
Nelson Story (1838–1926), American rancher
Nelson Story Jr. (1878–1932), American politician
Nelson R. Strong (1862–1930), American politician
Nelson Suárez (born 1956), Ecuadorian diver
Nelson Sullivan (1948–1989), American videographer

T
Nelson Tapia (born 1966), Chilean footballer
Nelson Ferebee Taylor (1920–2004), American lawyer
Nelson Teich (born 1957), Brazilian oncologist
Nelson Tennant (1923–2006), English rugby league footballer
Nelson Terán (born 1968), Mexican composer
Nelson Thall (born 1952), Canadian media scientist
Nelson Thomas, American baseball player
Nelson B. Tinnin (1905–1985), American politician
Nelson Toburen (born 1938), American football player
Nelson Torno (1927–2015), Argentine sports shooter
Nelson Townsend (1941–2015), American athletic administrator
Nelson Trad Sr. (1930–2011), Brazilian lawyer and politician
Nelson Trad Filho (born 1961), Brazilian politician
Nelson Wesley Trout (1921–1996), American bishop
Nelson Trujillo (born 1960), Venezuelan boxer
Nelson Tyler, American engineer

V
Nelson Vails (born 1960), American cyclist
Nelson Valdez (born 1983), Paraguayan footballer
Nelson H. Van Vorhes (1822–1882), American politician
Nelson Vargas (born 1974), American soccer player and coach
Nélson Vargas (born 1973), Colombian cyclist
Nélson Veiga (born 1978), Cape Verdean footballer
Nelson Villagra (born 1937), Chilean actor
Nelson Vivas (born 1969), Argentinian footballer

W
Nelson Wallulatum (1926–2010), Native American chief
Nelson Wang (born 1950), Chinese-Indian restaurateur
Nelson W. Ward (1837–1929), American army officer
Nelson J. Waterbury (1819–1894), American politician and lawyer
Nelson Weiper (born 2005), German footballer
Nelson Wheatcroft (1852–1897), English actor
Nelson E. Whitaker (1839–1909), American businessman and politician
Nelson Williams (disambiguation), multiple people
Nelson W. Winbush (born 1929), American educator
Nelson Wolff (born 1940), American politician
Nelson Woss, Australian film producer
Nelson Ikon Wu (1919–2002), Chinese-American writer

X
Nelson Xavier (1941–2017), Brazilian actor

Y
Nelson Torres Yordán (born 1981), Puerto Rican politician

Z
Nelson Zamora (born 1959), Uruguayan runner
Nelson Ryan Zamora (born 1991), Canadian soccer player
Nelson Zeglio (1926–2019), Brazilian footballer
Nelson Zelaya (born 1973), Paraguayan footballer

Fictional characters
Nelson, a Canada goose in the 2006 Disney animated film The Wild
Nelson Gabriel, a character in The Archers
Nelson Lee (detective), a character in various British story papers
Nelson Muntz, a character in The Simpsons
Nelson Van Alden, a character in Boardwalk Empire
Nelson van Sloan, a character in the 1989 American action comedy movie Speed Zone

See also
Nelson (disambiguation), a disambiguation page for Nelson
Nelson (surname), people with the surname "Nelson"

English masculine given names
English given names